Dean Morgan Junior High School is a public school in the Natrona County School District in Casper, Wyoming. The school serves about 900 students in grades six through eight. The building was listed on the National Register of Historic Places in 2016.

See also
National Register of Historic Places listings in Natrona County, Wyoming

References 

Public middle schools in Wyoming
Schools in Natrona County, Wyoming
Buildings and structures in Casper, Wyoming
National Register of Historic Places in Natrona County, Wyoming
School buildings on the National Register of Historic Places in Wyoming